"Black Fingernails, Red Wine" is a song by Australian alternative rock band Eskimo Joe, released in May 2006 as the lead single their third studio album of the same name. The song became their first song to peak inside the Australian Singles Chart top 10, peaking at number six. At the ARIA Music Awards of 2006, the song won ARIA Award for Single of the Year and was ranked number two on the Triple J Hottest 100 of 2006. At the 2007 West Australian Music Industry Awards, the song won Most Popular Single/EP.

Music videos
Two music videos were made for this song. One showed the band members in a car, kidnapping people in the middle of the night. At the end of the video, the kidnapped people were revealed to be Eskimo Joe themselves. When Kavyen Temperley was a guest on The Glass House, he offered that this symbolised that Eskimo Joe had changed, and the kidnapped band were the old Eskimo Joe. The second video shows the band playing in an old building. Due to the criminal theme of the first video, it received an MA15+ classification in Australia, restricting it to night-time airplay. The second promo clip was made to enable the song to be played by daytime music shows.

Track listings

Charts

Weekly charts

Year-end charts

Certifications

Release history

References

Eskimo Joe songs
2006 singles
ARIA Award-winning songs
Songs written by Kavyen Temperley
Songs written by Stuart MacLeod (musician)
Songs written by Joel Quartermain
2006 songs
Warner Music Australasia singles
Mushroom Records singles